Sidney Silodor (November 13, 1906 – August 4, 1963) was an American bridge player. Silodor was a World Champion, winning the Bermuda Bowl in 1950. Silodor is currently 6th on the all-time list of North American Bridge Championships wins with 34. Silodor was a lawyer from Havertown, Pennsylvania.

Silodor was named to its hall of fame by The Bridge World in 1966, which brought the number of members to nine, and was made a founding member of the ACBL Hall of Fame in 1995.

Silodor was born in Newark, New Jersey  to Charles and Pauline Silodor, Jewish emigrants from the Russian Empire. He was married to Elizabeth Collins. He died of brain cancer at Philadelphia's Temple University Hospital in 1963.

Bridge accomplishments

Honors

 ACBL Hall of Fame, 1966

Awards

 Mott-Smith Trophy (1) 1963

Wins

 Bermuda Bowl (1) 1950
 North American Bridge Championships (34)
 Master Individual (1) 1951 
 von Zedtwitz Life Master Pairs (1) 1946 
 Rockwell Mixed Pairs (3) 1951, 1955, 1956 
 Silodor Open Pairs (1) 1963 
 Hilliard Mixed Pairs (2) 1940, 1944 
 Fall National Open Pairs (2) 1941, 1946 
 Vanderbilt (8) 1944, 1945, 1950, 1955, 1956, 1957, 1959, 1960 
 Mitchell Board-a-Match Teams (3) 1952, 1956, 1961 
 Chicago Mixed Board-a-Match (4) 1941, 1943, 1944, 1954 
 Reisinger (6) 1942, 1943, 1950, 1954, 1956, 1961 
 Spingold (3) 1943, 1951, 1957

Runners-up

 Bermuda Bowl (2) 1958, 1961
 North American Bridge Championships
 von Zedtwitz Life Master Pairs (2) 1943, 1956 
 Wernher Open Pairs (3) 1941, 1950, 1958 
 Vanderbilt (1) 1953 
 Spingold (1) 1936 
 Mitchell Board-a-Match Teams (3) 1946, 1959, 1963 
 Chicago Mixed Board-a-Match (4) 1946, 1952, 1960, 1962 
 Reisinger (3) 1944, 1948, 1951 
 Spingold (5) 1947, 1950, 1955, 1960, 1961

Books 
Silodor is sometimes credited with two books, "Silodor Says" and "According to Silodor".
 Silodor Says: the grand slam of bridge literature (New York: Pageant Press, 1952), 240 pp., 
 Contract bridge: According to Silodor and Tierney, Silodor and John A. Tierney (Chestnut Hill, MA: Stanley–Allan Co., 1961), 442 pp.,  
 Complete Book of Duplicate Bridge, Norman Kay, Fred Karpin, and Silodor (G. P. Putnam, 1965), 496 pp.,

Articles 

 Lead
 Underleading an ace

Notes

References

External links
 
 
 

1906 births
1963 deaths
People from Newark, New Jersey
20th-century American Jews
American people of Russian-Jewish descent
American contract bridge players
Bermuda Bowl players
Contract bridge writers
20th-century American lawyers
People from Delaware County, Pennsylvania
Deaths from brain cancer in the United States
Deaths from cancer in Pennsylvania